Rabe Ferguson Marsh Jr. (April 26, 1905 – April 19, 1993) was a United States district judge of the United States District Court for the Western District of Pennsylvania.

Education and career

Born in Greensburg, Pennsylvania, Marsh received an Artium Baccalaureus degree from Lafayette College in 1927 and a Bachelor of Laws from the University of Pittsburgh School of Law in 1930. He was in private practice in Greensburg from 1930 to 1950. He was an assistant district attorney of Westmoreland County, Pennsylvania from 1942 to 1950.

Federal judicial service

On March 27, 1950, Marsh was nominated by President Harry S. Truman to a seat on the United States District Court for the Western District of Pennsylvania vacated by Judge Robert Murray Gibson. Marsh was confirmed by the United States Senate on June 2, 1950, and received his commission on June 8. He served as Chief Judge from 1969 to 1975, and assumed senior status on January 31, 1977. Marsh served in that capacity until his death on April 19, 1993, in Greensburg.

References

Sources
 

1905 births
1993 deaths
University of Pittsburgh School of Law alumni
Judges of the United States District Court for the Western District of Pennsylvania
United States district court judges appointed by Harry S. Truman
20th-century American judges
Lafayette College alumni
People from Greensburg, Pennsylvania